Takasago may refer to:

Related to Japan
 Takasago (play), a Noh play by Zeami Motokiyo
 Takasago, Hyōgo, a city located in Hyōgo Prefecture, Japan
 Japanese cruiser Takasago, a protected cruiser of the Imperial Japanese Navy in service 1897–1904
 Takasago International Corporation, an international producer of flavors and fragrances headquartered in Japan
 Takasago stable, a professional sumo stable (or heya)
 Takasago Oyakata, the head coach of Takasago stable

Related to Taiwan
 Takasago, the name Japan called Taiwan around the Edo period
 Takasago Volunteers, soldiers in the Imperial Japanese Army recruited from Taiwanese aboriginal tribes
 Taiwan Beer, Taiwanese beer formerly known as Takasago Beer